David Banks (born August 30, 1983) is an American rower. He competed at the 2008 and 2012 Summer Olympics.

References

External links
 

1983 births
Living people
American male rowers
Olympic rowers of the United States
Rowers at the 2008 Summer Olympics
Rowers at the 2012 Summer Olympics